was a city located in Kumamoto Prefecture, Japan. The city was founded on April 1, 1954.

As of 2003, the city had an estimated population of 17,429 and the density of 194.17 persons per km². The total area was 89.76 km².

On March 27, 2006, Ushibuka, along with the city of Hondo, and the towns of Amakusa, Ariake, Goshoura, Itsuwa, Kawaura, Kuratake, Shinwa and Sumoto (all from Amakusa District), was merged to create the new city of Amakusa and no longer exists as an independent municipality.

Climate

References

External links
 Official website of Amakusa 

Dissolved municipalities of Kumamoto Prefecture